The 2009 Brno Formula Two round was the second round of the 2009 FIA Formula Two Championship season. It was held on 20 and 21 June 2009 at Masaryk Circuit at Brno, Czech Republic. The first race was won by Mirko Bortolotti, with Mikhail Aleshin and Philipp Eng also on the podium. The second race was won by Andy Soucek, with Julien Jousse and Nicola de Marco also on the podium.

Classification

Qualifying 1
Weather/Track: Cloud 18°/Wet 20°

Race 1
Weather: Sun 28°; Track: Dry 49°

Qualifying 2
Weather/Track: Sun 14°/Dry 25°

Race 2
Weather: Cloud 26 °C; Track: Dry 29 °C

Standings after the race 
Drivers' Championship standings

References

FIA Formula Two Championship